J. F. Betz House is a historic home located at Kenton, Kent County, Delaware.  The house was built about 1875, and is a two-story, three bay, double pile dwelling with Greek Revival / Gothic Revival / Queen Anne influences.  It has a gable roof with cornice, pierced by a central cross gable.  The property includes a contributing  19th century granary and barn.

It was listed on the National Register of Historic Places in 1983.

References

Houses on the National Register of Historic Places in Delaware
Greek Revival houses in Delaware
Gothic Revival architecture in Delaware
Queen Anne architecture in Delaware
Houses completed in 1875
Houses in Kent County, Delaware
Kenton, Delaware
National Register of Historic Places in Kent County, Delaware